Drakkar Noir is a men's fragrance by Guy Laroche created by perfumer Pierre Wargnye. The fragrance was introduced in 1982 and is manufactured under license by the L'Oréal Group. It is a successor scent to the brand's 1972 fragrance Drakkar, launched to appeal to a British market. It won the 1985 FiFi Award for "Most Successful Men's Fragrance (Limited)" and, in 2010, the Canadian Fragrance Awards' "Hall of Fame Award—Men's". In 1991, it was the bestselling men's "prestige" ($20+) scent worldwide. The name is pronounced with the stress on the second syllable "Dra-CAR". According to The New York Times, the name derives from "a flat-bottomed Viking ship".

Product overview
Drakkar Noir comes in a sleek black metallic bottle. The fragrance is an aromatic fougère, with top notes of bergamot, rosemary, lavender, middle notes of cardamom and geranium, and a dry down of vetiver, cedar, and fir balsam. The top note includes prominent dihydromyrcenol, a synthetic odorant with a metallic citric-floral character, typical of the fougère family fragrances. Compared to the original Drakkar fragrance, Drakkar Noir is darker, with notes of leather and patchouli that the original lacks. Drakkar Noir helped cement a trend of fresh fougère scents in the 1980s.

Marketing

Marketing for Drakkar Noir has focused on themes of masculinity, sensuality, decadence, darkness, and lust. The name Drakkar is derived from the word drekar, a type of Viking longship, invoking the "virile charm" associated to the Viking warriors. The fragrance's name also has a similar sound to Dracula, a fictional vampire known for his seductive cruelty; through the name, themes associated with Dracula are believed to become unconsciously associated with the fragrance in the mind of consumers.

Print advertisements for Drakkar Noir have visually emphasized these themes. One ad displayed the fragrance bottle in the center of the page on a dark background, with a beam of light crossing the page and not touching the bottle; this lack of illumination serves to emphasize the bottle. The dark visuals of the ad are intended to subconsciously evoke mystery, sensuality, and forbidden pleasures. Another ad portrayed a man's unclothed arm from just below the wrist, gripping a bottle of Drakkar Noir. A woman's hand with long, red-painted nails assertively grips his bare arm at the wrist. The ad portrays masculine strength and the female desire for security in that strength. The ad was re-shot for the United Arab Emirates in order to accommodate cultural differences: in the UAE version, the man is wearing a suit, and the woman's fingers are lightly grazing his hand in a more subordinate fashion. The overall effect was to reduce the amount of bare skin displayed and to make the contact less obviously intimate, in accordance with Arabic cultural norms, without reducing the attractiveness of the image.

From 1986 to 1991, a TV commercial for the fragrance featured a mysterious young man engaging in masculine activities such as archery, nightclubbing, and flirting with a beautiful woman. From 1991 to 1993, another TV commercial featured a boxer and his girlfriend, played by supermodel Stephanie Seymour. The print advertising campaign was photographed by Herb Ritts. In 1994, a new commercial, shot by director Jean-Baptiste Mondino, was introduced. It depicted a rock star amongst his wildly excited fans. In 2013, a new commercial was released featuring the Brazilian football player Neymar Jr., photographed again by Jean-Baptiste Mondino, promoting social inclusion through sport.

In 1993, Guy Laroche offered a promotional CD, Best of Rock, with every purchase of Drakkar Noir. The CD featured tracks by Jimi Hendrix, Rod Stewart and others. In 2002, L'Oreal signed a US$10 million sponsorship agreement for NASCAR race driver Dale Earnhardt Jr. to endorse Drakkar Noir.

In popular culture
In the "Leggo My Meg-O" episode of the animated comedy series Family Guy – the 20th episode of the 10th season, originally broadcast on June 6, 2012 – Meg is kidnapped in Paris while on the phone to Peter.  One of the kidnappers says to him "Drakkar Noir".  Stewie and Brian go to Paris to rescue Meg, and get into the kidnapper's hideout by posing as Eastern European perfume salesmen.  They show the kidnappers their scents, and when each of them orders Drakkar Noir, compare their voices to a recording of the phone call using voice recognition software.
In "Rabbit or Duck", episode of the sitcom How I Met Your Mother – the 15th episode of the 5th season – Marshall Eriksen comments that the fragrance had been helpful in winning the love of his wife, Lily.
 In the episode "Hot Girl" of The Office, season 1 episode 6, Michael Scott asks Ryan Howard to help him clean out his car, to impress a saleswoman who has come to the office and Michael insisted on driving home. When cleaning out the car, Ryan finds an empty bottle of perfume, which Michael claims is an exact smell-alike to Drakkar Noir.
 In the episode "Mac is a Serial Killer" of It's Always Sunny in Philadelphia, Charlie and Frank search Mac's room for evidence of him being a serial killer, while Frank picks up a human anatomy book Charlie sprays himself with Drakkar Noir. Frank tells Charlie "it stinks that stuff". Charlie responds "this stuff is Drakkar Noir, man"
In Shameless Season 1, Episode 2 "Frank The Plank", Frank Gallagher comments on how he knows it was Steve who left him in Canada saying  “ When I woke up, in Toronto, in a park, looking like a f*cking homeless tweaker, all I could smell was Drakkar Noir. Middle of a park... Drakkar Noir. I just spent five hours with him in that camper. SAME SMELL.”
 In the show Raising Hope, Jimmy Chance's name during his emo phase was Drakkar Noir.
In season 1 episode 3 of Deadly Class, the teacher of the “Atypical Combat Skills” class, Master Zane boasts that as a bouncer at a Jersey Shore club he “knocked the Drakkar Noir off...” everyone who took a swing at him.
In season 1 episode 3 of Breaking Bad, Hank Schrader, while checking for drugs in Crazy 8's low-rider, says, "Smells like a Drakkar Noir factory in here".
The sixth song of the album called “Bankrupt!” By the band “Phoenix” has a song called “Drakkar Noir”.
In the film 10 Things I Hate About You, Kat Stratford (played by Julia Stiles) complains about prom, saying "Do you really wanna get all dressed up, so some Drakkar Noir-wearing dexter with a boner can feel you up while you're forced to listen to a band that, by definition, blows?
In The Lonely Island's album/special, The Unauthorized Bash Brothers Experience, Mark McGuire (Akiva Schaffer) states that his crib smells like Drakkar Noir
 In the Titans's Season 4 Episode 6 "Brother Blood", when asked about the smell, Superboy states that it's Drakkar Noir

References

External links

Perfumes
L'Oréal brands
Products introduced in 1982